Emission may refer to:

Chemical products
 Emission of air pollutants, notably:
Flue gas, gas exiting to the atmosphere via a flue
 Exhaust gas, flue gas generated by fuel combustion
 Emission of greenhouse gases, which absorb and emit radiant energy within the thermal infrared range
 Emission standards, limits on pollutants that can be released into the environment
 Emissions trading, a market-based approach to pollution control

Electromagnetic radiation
 Emission spectrum, the frequencies of electromagnetic radiation generated by molecular electrons making transitions to lower energy states
 Thermal emission, electromagnetic radiation generated by the thermal motion of particles in matter
 List of light sources, including both natural and artificial processes that emit light
 Emission (radiocommunications), a radio signal (usually modulated) emitted from a radio transmitter
 Emission coefficient, a coefficient in the power output per unit time of an electromagnetic source
 Emission line, or "spectral line", a dark or bright line in an otherwise uniform and continuous spectrum
 Emission nebula, a cloud of ionized gas emitting light of various colors
 Emission theory, a competing theory for the special theory of relativity, explaining the results of the Michelson-Morley experiment
 Emission theory (vision), the proposal that visual perception is accomplished by rays of light emitted by the eyes

Other uses 
 Thermionic emission, the flow of charged particles called thermions from a charged metal or a charged metal oxide surface, archaically known as the Edison effect
 Ejaculation, the ejection of semen from the penis; also, specifically:
 Nocturnal emission, ejaculation experienced during sleep
 Noise, emission
 Exhalation of air, especially in the context of musical instruments

See also 
 Emissions control (disambiguation)
 Emitter (disambiguation)
 Emit (disambiguation)